Nová Ves is a municipality and village in Prague-East District in the Central Bohemian Region of the Czech Republic. It has about 1,400 inhabitants.

History
The first written mention about Nová Ves is from 1455. Between 1960 and 1990 it was a part of Čakovičky. Since 1990 it has been an independent municipality again.

References

External links

Villages in Prague-East District